The seventh and final season of the American television drama series Scandal was ordered on February 10, 2017 by ABC. It was later announced that the seventh season would be the final season for Scandal. The season began airing on October 5, 2017, and consisted of 18 episodes, adding the total episode count of the show to 124 episodes. Cast member George Newbern was upgraded to a series regular after being a recurring cast member for the past six seasons. The season was produced by ABC Studios, in association with ShondaLand Production Company; the showrunner being Shonda Rhimes.

The season focuses on Olivia Pope and her new position as Chief of Staff of President Mellie Grant and the Command of B613. It also depicts Quinn Perkins as the boss of her crisis management firm Quinn Perkins & Associates, and its team, as well as staff at the White House in Washington, D.C., in their efforts to deal with and contain political scandals. Season seven had have twelve series regulars, all returning from the previous season, out of which six are part of the original cast of eight regulars from the first season. The season aired on Thursday nights at 9:00 pm until episode 15, where it aired in its original timeslot, Thursday 10:00 pm.

Cast and characters

Main 

 Kerry Washington as  Chief of Staff Olivia Pope  
 Scott Foley as Jake Ballard 
 Darby Stanchfield as Abby Whelan 
 Katie Lowes as Quinn Perkins 
 Guillermo Diaz as Diego "Huck" Muñoz 
 Jeff Perry as Vice President Cyrus Beene
 Joshua Malina as David Rosen
 Bellamy Young as President Mellie Grant
 Joe Morton as Elijah "Eli"/"Rowan" Pope
 George Newbern as Charlie
 Cornelius Smith Jr. as Marcus Walker
 Tony Goldwyn as President Fitzgerald "Fitz" Thomas Grant III

Recurring 
 Jay Hernandez as Curtis Pryce
 Faran Tahir as President Rashad
 Shaun Toub as Ambassador Marashi
 Dean Norris as Fenton Glackland
 Whitney Hice as Hannah
 Michael O'Neill as Lonnie Mencken

Guest stars 
 Bess Armstrong as Senator Diane Greenwald
 Caroline Day as Lucy Riccio
 Medalion Rahimi as Yasmeen
 Viola Davis as Annalise Keating
 Aja Naomi King as Michaela Pratt
 Tom Irwin as Justice Spivey
 Khandi Alexander as Maya Lewis
 Jessalyn Gilsig as Vanessa Ballard
 Kate Burton as Sally Langston
 Gregg Henry as Hollis Doyle
 Tom Amandes as Samuel Reston
 Brian Letscher as Tom Larsen

Episodes

Production

Development
Scandal was renewed for a seventh season on February 10, 2017, along with the other ShondaLand dramas. The series continued to air on Thursdays in its 9 p.m. E.T. timeslot like the previous seasons, but unlike the previous season which aired in January, the seventh season premiered in the fall of 2017. ABC announced on June 26, 2017, that the seventh season would consist of 18 episodes.

Long-time director Tom Verica shared on Twitter that he would only direct the series finale as well as the fact that Kerry Washington would be directing her first episode. Actress Darby Stanchfield also directed her first episode.

Final season
Speculations about the seventh season being the final season had started as the sixth season began airing. ABC entertainment president Channing Dungey commented in January 2017 that it had not been much discussion about the show's future after the seventh season, but she would happily keep the show on as long as Rhimes "feels that she has creative runway to write the show." Andy Swift from TVLine said that the show needed to end after the seventh season as he felt "this once-great drama is simply spinning its wheels, serving us the same old flavors with only slightly different toppings." Before the sixth-season finale, multiple sources reported that Scandal would be ending next season. ABC confirmed on May 16, 2017, that the seventh season would be the final season for the show. Shonda Rhimes released a statement about the ending of the show calling the seventh season "Olivia's Swan Song" as she said:

How to Get Away with Murder crossover
On January 3, 2018, Kerry Washington tweeted out a photo to Viola Davis of herself in a "familiar" setting, that being a courthouse used for the set of How to Get Away with Murder. Fans began to speculate a possible crossover episode being in the works, which was only heightened when Davis tweeted out a photo in response, that being her on the set of Mellie Grant's (Bellamy Young) Oval Office. Later that day, the crossover was officially confirmed through a tweet by Scandal creator Shonda Rhimes.

How to Get Away with Murder creator Peter Nowalk later went on to share in an interview with Deadline:

Casting
In May 2017, actor George Newbern, who has had recurring appearances since the show's beginning as Charlie, was promoted to the regular cast. In August, Jay Hernandez and Shaun Toub were cast in unspecified, recurring roles.

Reception

Ratings

Critical response
Review aggregator Rotten Tomatoes reported a 91% "certified fresh" approval rating with an average rating of 7.85/10, based on 22 reviews. The site's critical consensus states: "With the aptitude that helped change the face of serialized drama, Scandal concludes its fiery run with unpredictability, heart, and an emphasis on cultural affairs."

Awards and nominations

References

External links
 
 

2017 American television seasons
2018 American television seasons
Season 7